Cesare Stea (August 17, 1893 – 1960) was an American sculptor and painter.

Life
Stea was born in Bari, Italy.  He studied at the Beaux-Arts Institute of Design, National Academy of Design, Cooper Union and the Académie de la Grande Chaumière, where he studied with Antoine Bourdelle. He variously studied with Hermon McNeil, Sterling Calder and Solon Borglum.

He was a member of the Federal Art Project. He created relief sculptures, "Men and Machines" (1939) in Newcomerstown, Ohio,  "Industry" (1941) in Wyomissing, Pennsylvania, and "Sculptural Relief" (1936) at Bowery Bay Sewage Disposal Plant. His work can also be found in Whitney Museum of American Art in New York and the Smithsonian Institution's National Portrait Gallery in Washington D.C.

Stea was a member of the National Sculpture Society.

His papers are held at the Archives of American Art.

References

External links
"New York Sculpture during the Federal Project", Eleanor Carr, Art Journal, Vol. 31, No. 4 (Summer, 1972), pp. 397–403
Cesare Stea at Ask Art

1893 births
1960 deaths
Federal Art Project artists
20th-century American sculptors
20th-century American male artists
American male sculptors
National Sculpture Society members
Sculptors Guild members
Beaux-Arts Institute of Design (New York City) alumni
Italian emigrants to the United States